Gerben Albert (Gerben) Moerman (Schipluiden, 1976) is a Dutch sociologist who teaches at the University of Amsterdam (UvA). His specialty is sociological methodology, and he is member of the UvA group for Dynamics of Citizenship and Culture. He is considered something of an expert on breaching, and has drawn attention for a hobby of his--the Paul is dead conspiracy theory. In 2012, he was chosen as UvA teacher of the year; he was praised for being able to interest his students in the unpopular subject of sociological methodology, and for linking theory to society and continually surprising his students.

Publicatie 
 Gerben Albert Moerman: Probing behaviour in open interviews. A field experiment on the effects of probing tactics on quality and content of the received information. Dissertation Vrije Universiteit Amsterdam, 2010.

References

External links
Gerben Moerman at UvA

1976 births
Living people
Dutch sociologists
Academic staff of the University of Amsterdam
People from Midden-Delfland